Taran Adarsh (born 13 June 1965) is an Indian film critic and trade analyst. He is best known for giving trade figures and box office updates on social media.

Career 
Taran Adarsh started his journalism career at the age of 15 with Trade Guide, a weekly box office magazine. In 1994, Adarsh produced and wrote the Bollywood film-based TV serial Hello Bollywood, starring Shehzad Khan and Kashmera Shah. He continued his work on Trade Guide alongside. He is currently an active film critic, journalist and trade analyst on Bollywood Hungama, a Bollywood entertainment website.

References

External links 

Indian film critics
Living people
1965 births
People from Mumbai